Hotspur F.C. was an association football club who originally played at Battersea Park in London, and in 1884 moved to Merton Hall Farm in Wimbledon.  The club took its name from Harry Hotspur.

The club has no link with Tottenham Hotspur, which came from the Hotspur Cricket Club founded in 1880, but which had to add "Tottenham" in April 1884 because post to the Hotspur club was being diverted to north London.

History

The club was founded in 1878.

The club entered the FA Cup for the first time in 1879-80.  It beat the Argonauts in the first round, following a replay, and lost to West End in the second.  The club's best run in the Cup came in 1881-82, when it won three ties to reach the fourth round (which that year was made up of 14 clubs), losing 5–0 to Upton Park.

The club consistently entered the Cup until 1887-88, its last tie being a second round defeat to Dulwich.  By that season the club had reduced the number of sides it could field from three to two; in February 1887 its reserve side had a fixture against Tottenham Hotspur.  The club remained in existence until at least 1889.

Colours

The club's colours were dark blue shirts with a white Maltese cross, white knickerbockers, and dark blue socks.

References

Association football clubs established in 1878
1878 establishments in England
Battersea
Wimbledon, London
Defunct football clubs in England
Sport in the London Borough of Wandsworth
Defunct football clubs in London